Stigmella hakekeae is a moth of the family Nepticulidae. It is found in New Zealand.

The length of the forewings is about 3 mm. Adults have been recorded in every month except March and April. There are four or five generations per year.

The larvae feed on Olearia species, such as Olearia arborescens, Olearia ilicifolia, Olearia macrodonta, Olearia nummularifolia and Olearia paniculata. They mine the leaves of their host plant. The mine consists of a tortuous gallery under the upper epidermal layer, following the rib to the leaf margin, which it then follows. Frass is deposited against the roof of the mine. A single leaf of O. arborescens may contain many mines, but on O . macrodonta rarely have more than three been found. Larva have been recorded from May to August and in October. They are 3 to 4 mm long and greenish white.

The cocoon is made of brown silk and can be found on the ground.

References

External links
Fauna of New Zealand - Number 16: Nepticulidae (Insecta: Lepidoptera)

Nepticulidae
Moths of New Zealand
Endemic fauna of New Zealand
Moths described in 1989
Endemic moths of New Zealand